Kollur is a village and panchayat in Sangareddy district, Telangana, India. The Outer Ring Road, Hyderabad is passing through and has a major junction in the village.

It is 35 km away from Hyderabad.

References

Villages in Ranga Reddy district